Chandleria elegans is a species of rove beetles in the subfamily Pselaphinae. The type specimen was from Volcán, Chiriquí Province, Panama.

References 

 Notes sur les Pselaphines néotropicaux (Coleoptera, Staphylinidae, Pselaphinae) 10: Un nouveau genre et quatre nouvelles espèces de la tribu Metoiasini. Comellini A., Revue Suisse de Zoologie, 1998, vol. 105, no 2, pages 345–350,  (text at archive.org)

External links 

Beetles described in 1887
Pselaphinae
Fauna of Panama